Iván Velásquez Gómez (born 12 May 1955) is a Colombian jurist and diplomat. From October 2013 to September 2019, he was the head of the International Commission against Impunity in Guatemala (CICIG).

Biography
Iván Velásquez was born in Medellín, Colombia. He studied law at the University of Antioquia. Later, he was appointed Antioquia Deputy Prosecutor during 1991 and 1994, where he initiated investigations related to torture, extrajudicial executions and abuses. In 1996 he was assistant magistrate in the Council of State, and a year later he was elected Regional Director of Public Prosecutors' Offices in Medellin for 1997 to 1999. 
He was elected auxiliary magistrate of the Supreme Court of Justice of Colombia in 2000. Between 2006 and 2012, Velásquez coordinated the Commission of Investigative Support of the Criminal Chamber, in charge of investigating the Parapolitica case.

In 2011 he was awarded the World Human Rights Prize by the International Bar Association and a year later the Association of German Judges awarded him for his commitment in the fight against corruption.

At the end of September 2013, he was appointed Commissioner of the International Commission against Impunity in Guatemala (CICIG) at the level of Assistant Secretary General of the United Nations Organization, replacing Francisco Dall'Anese.

In 2018 he was awarded the Right Livelihood Award along with Thelma Aldana for "their innovative work [with CICIG] in exposing abuse of power and prosecuting corruption, thus rebuilding people’s trust in public institutions."

On 27 June 2022 he was appointed new Defense Minister under President-elect Gustavo Petro.

References

|-

|-

Living people
1955 births
20th-century Colombian lawyers
University of Antioquia alumni
Academic staff of the University of Antioquia
21st-century Colombian judges
Colombian officials of the United Nations
People from Medellín
Cabinet of Gustavo Petro
Colombian Ministers of Defense
21st-century Colombian politicians